Robert Wilmer Woods,  (14 February 1914 – 20 October 1997), known as Robin Woods, was an English Anglican bishop. He was the Bishop of Worcester from 1971 to 1982. He previously served as Archdeacon of Sheffield from 1958 to 1962, and as Dean of Windsor from 1962 to 1970.

Early life and education
Woods was the youngest son of the Right Reverend Edward Sydney Woods (1877–1953), Bishop of Lichfield, and Clemence Barclay. He was the brother of the photographer Janet Woods, Samuel Woods, an archdeacon in New Zealand, and Frank Woods, Archbishop of Melbourne, and a nephew of Theodore Woods, who had served as Bishop of Winchester.

He was educated at The New Beacon, Gresham's School, Holt, and Trinity College, Cambridge.

Career

Ordained ministry
Woods was ordained a deacon of the Church of England in 1938 and a priest in 1939. He was Assistant Secretary of the Student Christian Movement between 1937 and 1942. His first clerical position was as curate at St Edmund the King, Lombard Street, London 1938–1939, and at Hoddesdon 1939–1942.

Military service
Woods served in the British Army during World War II from 1942 to 1946. On 26 September 1942, he was commissioned into the Royal Army Chaplains' Department as a Chaplain to the Forces 4th Class (equivalent to captain). In November 1945, he was mentioned in dispatches "in recognition of gallant and distinguished services in Italy".

Post-war

After the war, he was given his first benefice as Vicar of South Wigston, Leicester, in 1946, then in 1951 went to Malaya as Archdeacon of Singapore and Vicar of St Andrew's Cathedral. In 1958 he returned to England to become Archdeacon of Sheffield and Rector of Tankersley. In 1962, he was appointed Dean of Windsor and Domestic Chaplain to the Queen and played an influential part in the education of Charles, Prince of Wales. It was his recommendation to send Charles to Trinity College, Cambridge, his own old college. While at Windsor, he also served as Registrar of the Most Noble Order of the Garter. In 1970, he became Bishop of Worcester and was appointed a Knight Commander of the Royal Victorian Order, an honour in the personal gift of the sovereign. He retired in 1981.

Other positions Woods held include:
Prelate of the Most Noble Order of the Garter
Prelate of the Order of St Michael and St George
Secretary of the Anglican-Methodist Commission for Unity, 1965–1974
Member of Council of the Duke of Edinburgh's Award Scheme, from 1968
Member of the Public Schools Commission, 1968–1970
Governor of Haileybury and Imperial Service College
Visitor of Malvern College, 1970–1981
President and Chairman of Council of Queen's College, Birmingham, 1970–1985
Chairman of the Windsor Festival Company, 1969–1971
Chairman of the Churches Television Centre, 1969–79
Director of Christian Aid, 1969

Later life and death

His ashes are buried in the cloisters of Worcester Cathedral.

According to his obituary in The Times, Woods was the most successful Dean of Windsor in the twentieth century.

Honours
Knight Commander of the Royal Victorian Order, 1971
Knight Commander of the Order of St Michael and St George, 1989
A judge of the Templeton Prize

Family
Woods married Henrietta ("Etta") Marian Wilson, in 1942, and they had two sons and three daughters. His widow died on 8 February 2005, at the age of 88. Through this marriage Woods became one of the wealthiest clergymen in the Church of England.

In television
Woods was portrayed by Tim McMullan in the Netflix series The Crown, although his appointment as Dean of Windsor appears to be set around the time of the first Moon landing in 1969.

Publications
Lord of All, Hear Our Prayer (ed.)
Robin Woods: an autobiography (1986)

References

Sources
Who's Who 1993 (A. & C. Black, London, 1993) p.2063
Robin Woods: an autobiography  (SCM Press, 1986)
Telegraph wills

1914 births
1997 deaths
20th-century Church of England bishops
Alumni of Trinity College, Cambridge
Archdeacons of Sheffield
Archdeacons of Singapore
Bishops of Worcester
Burials at Worcester Cathedral
Deans of Windsor
Honorary Chaplains to the Queen
Knights Commander of the Order of St Michael and St George
Knights Commander of the Royal Victorian Order
Royal Army Chaplains' Department officers
People educated at Gresham's School